Ludovic Guerriero  (born 5 January 1985) is a French former professional footballer who played as a midfielder.

Career
Guerriero was born in Forbach, Moselle. He signed his first professional contract with French Ligue 1 club AS Nancy in 2003, but only appeared in two league matches in his first two seasons.  At age 20, he was loaned to Championnat National club US Raon-l'Étape for the 2005–06 season.  Guerriero played in 33 matches, scoring six goals for Raon-l'Étape, before returning to AS Nancy.

Following the 2007–08 season, Guerriero moved to Ligue 2 club AC Ajaccio on a three-year contract. He was AC Ajaccio's fourth signing of the summer and is expected to be a versatile player either in central or lateral defense.  Guerriero expressed confidence that he could help the club gain promotion to Ligue 1.

In the summer 2019, Guerriero joined SO Merlebach.

Notes

References
 
 

1985 births
Living people
People from Forbach
Sportspeople from Moselle (department)
French footballers
Association football midfielders
AS Nancy Lorraine players
AC Ajaccio players
FC Metz players
LB Châteauroux players
Stade Lavallois players
FC Petrolul Ploiești players
US Raon-l'Étape players
Pau FC players
SO Merlebach players
Ligue 1 players
Ligue 2 players
Championnat National players
Championnat National 3 players
Liga I players
French expatriate footballers
French expatriate sportspeople in Romania
Expatriate footballers in Romania
Footballers from Grand Est